Mr. Brown Can Moo! Can You? is a children's book written and illustrated by Theodor Geisel under the pen name Dr. Seuss and first published by Random House in 1970.

Plot
The story follows a man named Mr. Brown, who can make a wide variety of sounds, imitating the sounds of animals and inanimate objects. The narrator recites a list of items and animals that Mr. Brown can sound like, each one accompanied by illustrations of the object and an onomatopoeia, which replicates the sound he can make. Mr. Brown can make the "moo" of a cow, the "buzz" of a bee, the "pop" of a cork (on a bottle of grape wine), the "klopp klopp" of a horse's hooves, the "cock a doodle doo" of a rooster, the "hoo hoo" of an owl, the "dibble dibble dibble dopp" of rain, the "tick tock" of a clock, the "knock knock" of a hand against a door, the "boom" of thunder, the "grum grum" of a hippo chewing gum, the "slurp slurp" of a cat drinking, the "splatt" of lightning, the "choo choo" of a train, the "sizzle sizzle" of an egg in a frying pan, the "blurp blurp" of a horn, the "pip" of a goldfish kiss, the "eek eek" like a shoe, and the "whisper" of a butterfly. The narrator concludes the list by suggesting that the reader try to make these same sounds, and the last pages of text feature a list of all the onomatopoeias featured in the book.

References

American picture books
Books by Dr. Seuss
1970 children's books
Onomatopoeia
Random House books